Shelley Washington (born 1991) is an American composer and performer. She is also a saxophonist, vocalist, and plays flute, clarinet, and English handbells.

Biography 
Washington holds a Master of Music degree from New York University and an undergraduate degree in saxophone and Masters of Education from Truman State University.

Washington's compositions have been performed by the Brooklyn Youth Chorus, Lior Willinger, NYU Orchestra, Angela Collier Reynolds, Face the Music Mika Quartet, Bang on a Can Festival Fellows, the Schiele String Quartet, and the Loud Box New Music Collective.

Washington has taught with the New York Philharmonic Very Young Composers program, and in the Young Composers and Improvisers Workshop. She has also served as the Artistic Director for the Noel Pointer Foundation, located in Brooklyn, and is a member of the Kinds of Kings Collective.

In an interview with the American Composers Forum, Washington describes her music as eclectic. “I like collage work. I feel like my brain is a definite patchwork,” she says. At the same time, she explains, "It’s harder for me to write when there’s too much musical input. I already have sensitivity issues. It’s more like conversations are hard for me. All the chatter just sounds like clucking to me. I can pick up on drums and rhythms because they’re consistent. “Swept away” is a very good way of putting it because I don’t often get to decide where my mind is going."

Works List

 The Third Colossus Full Orchestra (2,1,3,3, - 4, 3, 3, 1, perc, hp, pno, str) 2017 
 The Farthest SSSAAA Choir (Brooklyn Youth Chorus), 2 Violins, Viola, Cello, 2018 Bass, Bari Sax, Piano, Electric Guitar, Drum Set (ICE) 
 A Kind of Lung Large mixed chamber ensemble 2017 
 Silk Piano, Double Bass, mixed percussion 2017 
 What We Might Have Heard While Waiting for the Nth Wave Violins, Viola, Cello, Bass, Bb and Bass Clarinets, Piano, and two Percussionists  2017 
 The Workers’ Dreadnought Electric Guitar Quartet 2017 
 SAY String Quartet using body percussion and voice 2016 
 Their Name is Yours Flute, Violin, Horn in F, Drum Set, Vocals (by instrumentalists) 2016 
 TOTAAL Two Alto Saxophones, Baritone Saxophone, 3 Electric Guitars 2016 
 MIDDLEGROUND String Quartet 2016 
 ENDLESS ENDLESS ENDLESS Flute duo 2017 
 BIG Talk Baritone Saxophone duo 2016 
 Solo Towers Solo piano- commissioned by Lior Willinger 2018 
 BLACK MARY Solo alto or baritone saxophone 2018 
 MO’INGUS Solo baritone Saxophone 2016

References 

1991 births
Living people
Truman State University alumni
New York University alumni
21st-century American composers
American women composers
21st-century American women